Saxifraga federici-augusti (syn. Saxifraga grisebachii), common name Engleria saxifrage, is a herbaceous perennial plant belonging to the Saxifragaceae family. Its subspecies Saxifraga federiciaugusti subsp. grisebachii and the 'Wisley' cultivar of that subspecies have both gained the Royal Horticultural Society's Award of Garden Merit.

Description
Saxifraga federici-augusti reaches on average  in height. The flowers are red-purple. The flowering period extends from January through March.

Distribution
This plant is native to Greece, Albania, and the former Yugoslavia.

Subspecies
The following subspecies are accepted:
Saxifraga federici-augusti subsp. federici-augusti
Saxifraga federici-augusti subsp. grisebachii (Degen & Dörfl.) D.A.Webb

References

 Prain, D. (1910q): Saxifraga grisebachii. South East Europe - Curtis's botanical magazine 136, pp. 8308

External links 
 Greek Mountain Flora

grisebachii
Flora of Albania
Flora of Greece
Flora of Yugoslavia